King Christian X Land is an area of northeastern Greenland.

History  
This area was named after King Christian X of Denmark and Iceland (1870 – 1947), who rose to the throne in 1912. At the time of the Three-year Expedition to East Greenland it is reported that when Lauge Koch was planning to fly over the region in 1932 he said:  

The name 'King Christian X Land' was first used on the 1932 1:1 million scale Danish Geodesic Institute map.  At that time the area was occupied by Norway and was renamed 'Erik the Red's Land' (Eirik Raudes Land) but the Permanent Court of International Justice ruled against Norway in 1933 and the country subsequently abandoned its claims.

Myggbukta was a Norwegian radio and weather station that operated in the coast intermittently during the 20th century.

Geography
King Christian X Land stretches above the Arctic Circle between the Scoresby Sound at 70°N and the Bessel Fjord at 76°N. It is bordered by King Christian IX Land on the south, King Frederick VIII Land to the north, and the Greenland Ice Sheet to the west. All its territory is included in the large Northeast Greenland National Park zone.  

It includes the Stauning Alps, Scoresby Land, as well as the vast glacier and fjord expanses of northeastern Greenland between the ice sheet area west of the Kaiser Franz Joseph Fjord and the eastern end of Wollaston Foreland in the shore of the Greenland Sea.

The area is uninhabited except for Daneborg station, Zackenberg research facility located near the Zackenberg mountain. and the Mestersvig military outpost.

Image gallery

References 

Geography of Greenland
Geography of the Arctic